A Chit Sone Crush? is a 2019 Burmese romance film starring Myint Myat, Thinzar Wint Kyaw, Ei Chaw Po and May Myint Mo. The film, produced by New Phoe Wa Film Production premiered in Myanmar on August 29, 2019.

Cast
Myint Myat as Kaung Kin
Thinzar Wint Kyaw as Jasmine
Ei Chaw Po as Ngwe La Yaung
May Myint Mo as Ngwe Hnin Hmone

References

2019 films
2010s Burmese-language films
Burmese romantic drama films
Films shot in Myanmar